The graphic telescope is a type of camera lucida that has the power of a telescope. It was invented by Cornelius Varley in 1809. It can be used to draw broad landscapes.

Graphic telescopes allow the size of the projected image to be adjusted. They can be used separately, or with a portable table to reduce vibrations. They may also be mounted in a vehicle.

See also
 List of telescope types

References

External links
Camera lucida and Varley Graphic telescope
 
  (includes 1840 magazine article on instrument)
 A picture of a Graphic telescope, another.

Artistic techniques
Telescope types